Tanéné is a town and sub-prefecture in the Dubréka Prefecture in the Kindia Region of western Guinea.

References

Sub-prefectures of the Kindia Region